Yu Zhigang may refer to:
 Yu Zhigang (academic administrator)
 Yu Zhigang (politician)